Dmitri Sukhanov is a Russian pair skater. Competing for the Soviet Union with Evgenia Chernyshova, he won gold at the 1989 World Junior Championships, after taking silver a year earlier. They were coached by Natalia Pavlova in Saint Petersburg. Sukhanov later competed with Oksana Kazakova for Russia, winning silver at the 1994 Nations Cup.

In 1995, Sukhanov retired from competition and moved to England. He began performing in shows in 1996 with his partner and wife Fiona Zaldua; they continue to perform as adagio pair skaters worldwide.

Results

With Kazakova

With Chernyshova

References

Navigation

Soviet male pair skaters
Russian male pair skaters
Living people
World Junior Figure Skating Championships medalists
Figure skaters from Saint Petersburg
Universiade medalists in figure skating
Year of birth missing (living people)
Universiade silver medalists for the Soviet Union
Competitors at the 1991 Winter Universiade